Aglaia yzermannii is a species of plant in the family Meliaceae. It is found in Indonesia and Malaysia.

References

yzermannii
Vulnerable plants
Taxonomy articles created by Polbot
Taxa named by Jacob Gijsbert Boerlage
Taxa named by Sijfert Hendrik Koorders